Ioseliani is a Georgian surname, which may refer to:

Jaba Ioseliani (1926–2003), Georgian politician and military commander 
Nana Ioseliani, Georgian chess player
Platon Ioseliani, Georgian historian
Otar Iosseliani, Georgian-French film maker
Otia Ioseliani, Georgian writer 

Georgian-language surnames